In organic chemistry, isodiazomethane, also known as isocyanamide, aminoisonitrile, or systematically as isocyanoamine, is the parent compound of a class of derivatives of general formula R2N–NC. It has the condensed formula H2N–N+≡C–, making it an isomer of diazomethane.  It is prepared by protonating an ethereal solution of lithiodiazomethane, LiCHN2, with aqueous NaH2PO4 or NH4Cl.  The parent compound is only marginally stable at room temperature and is isolated by removal of solvent at –50 °C.  Derivatives are generally prepared by dehydration of the corresponding substituted formylhydrazine with COCl2 and Et3N.

Earlier, the compound was misidentified as the isomeric nitrilimine, HN––N+≡CH.  However, this structure was disproven by 1H NMR studies, which show a compound with a single signal at δ 6.40 ppm in (CD3CD2)2O instead of two signals expected for nitrilimine.  Moreover, an infrared band at 2140 cm−1 was assigned to the isocyano group.  Transition metal complexes of isodiazomethane have been prepared. In bulk form isodiazomethane is a liquid which decomposes when the temperature exceeds 15 °C. If it is heated to 40 °C, the substance explodes. A solution of isodiazomethane in diethyl ether at –30 °C gradually isomerizes to diazomethane upon exposure to sodium hydroxide for 20 min.

Microwave spectroscopy indicates that unlike diazomethane, isodiazomethane is not completely planar, with the amino nitrogen undergoing inversion.  An ab initio study indicated that there is some N–N double bond character in H2N–N≡C, although less so than in the N–C bond of H2N–C≡N. Like other isocyanide derivatives and carbon monoxide, its primary resonance form carries a negative charge and lone pair on carbon, a comparatively rare situation for neutral molecules.  A resonance form with zero formal charge on all atoms also has some importance; however, the carbon atom only has a sextet of electrons and is formally a carbene.

References 

Functional groups